RDP Internacional - Rádio Portugal (abbreviated as RDPi), is an international radio broadcasting station of Rádio e Televisão de Portugal. It aims at overseas Portuguese communities in Europe, Africa, South America, North America, India/Middle East as well as East Timor.

Overview

RDPi is available worldwide via satellite and Internet, serving most Portuguese-speaking communities in Europe, Africa, North America (United States/ Canada), South America (Brazil), Venezuela and India/Middle East. In Díli (East Timor), RDPi broadcasts also on 105.3 FM, but some programmes are also relayed by Radio Timor Leste, together with local broadcasts.

RDP International's predecessor, the Serviço de Ondas Curtas da Emissora Nacional, launched shortwave transmissions in 1936, which initially served the Portuguese cod fishing fleet in the waters of Newfoundland and Labrador, but by 1939 its remit was extended to provide information, music and Portuguese-language content to the entire Portuguese Empire. RDP International ceased all shortwave transmissions on 1 June 2011.

RTP main shortwave broadcasting centre, known as "CEOC - Centro Emissor de Onda Curta" (lit. SW transmitting centre) was located near Pegões, Portugal, has four 300 kW shortwave transmitters (1 TELEFUNKEN S 4005 and 3 THALES TSW 2300) and four 100 kW transmitters as backup, which served 6 transmitting antennas. Broadcasts to Venezuela and India/Middle East used only 100 kW because of technical limitations: antennas cannot handle powers above 100 kW. Transmissions to Europe, America and Africa used 300 kW.

RDPi also used ProFunk GmbH centre in Sines, as part of an agreement made between the Portuguese State and Deutsche Welle; since January 2009, weekend broadcasts from Sines used Digital Radio Mondiale (DRM) targeting central Europe.

Although RDP had a radio channel dedicated to Portuguese-speaking Africa countries, RDP África, RDPi covered those countries on shortwave, even in areas not served by RDP África. Nonetheless, some African radios relay some programmes from RDPi, specially Portuguese football games.

Some programmes, in particular newscasts and football games broadcast on RDPi and RDP Antena 1 were also relayed on many Portuguese-speaking radios around the world, like Radio Alfa - 98.6 FM Paris (France) and WJFD (Radio Globo) - 97.3 FM Massachusetts (United States).

External links
  
 RDP Internacional live stream on RTP Play 

International broadcasters
Radio stations in Brazil
Radio stations in East Timor
Radio stations in Portugal
Portuguese-language radio stations
Rádio e Televisão de Portugal